Swan Lake was a Canadian indie supergroup comprising Carey Mercer of Frog Eyes and Blackout Beach, Dan Bejar of Destroyer, Hello, Blue Roses and The New Pornographers, and Spencer Krug of Wolf Parade, Sunset Rubdown and Frog Eyes.

History

The group originally performed under the moniker "Thunder Cloud"; after discovering another band with that name, they changed to Swan Lake. The band released their debut album Beast Moans in November, 2006 through Jagjaguwar. The album was named by Mercer after Krug described the sound as "a boar dying in a tar pit", and featured a cover design by Daniel Murphy.

Enemy Mine, the second album from Swan Lake was released in March, 2009. The nine song album was recorded in Victoria, British Columbia in early 2008. The band claims to take a more focused effort on collaborative song writing on Enemy Mine, instead of the avant-garde mash of styles heard on Beast Moans.

Members
Spencer Krug: Keyboard, Guitar, Vocals
Carey Mercer: Guitar, Vocals
Dan Bejar: Guitar, Vocals

Discography
 Beast Moans (2006) Jagjaguwar
 Enemy Mine'' (2009) Jagjaguwar

References

External links
Official website
"Swan Lake Reveal Debut Album", Pitchfork Media link
Matt LeMay, "Interview: Destroyer", Pitchfork Media link

Canadian indie rock groups
Jagjaguwar artists
Musical groups established in 2006
Rock music supergroups
Musical groups disestablished in 2009
2006 establishments in Canada
2009 disestablishments in Canada